Wirahadikusumah is an Indonesian family whose members have been active in politics and the military in the 20th century. Prominent members of the family include:

 Umar Wirahadikusumah (1924–2003), Indonesian politician and army general
 Agus Wirahadikusumah (1951–2001), former Kostrad commander

Indonesian-language surnames